Cynometra longipedicellata is a species of plant in the family Fabaceae. It is found only in Tanzania.

Taxonomy

References

longipedicellata
Flora of Tanzania
Taxonomy articles created by Polbot
Critically endangered flora of Africa